Daphnandra is a genus of shrubs and trees in the family Atherospermataceae, or formerly Monimiaceae. The genus is endemic to Australia.

There are six species, occurring in New South Wales and Queensland: 
Daphnandra apatela Schodde Socket wood, yellow wood, canary socketwood, satin wood 
Daphnandra johnsonii Schodde Illawarra socketwood
Daphnandra melasmena Schodde
Daphnandra micrantha (Tul.) Benth.
Daphnandra repandula (F.Muell.) F.Muell. Sassafras, grey sassafras, northern sassafras, northern yellow sassafras, scentless sassafras, yellow sassafras
Daphnandra tenuipes J.R.Perkins, Red-flowered socketwood, socket sassafras

The generic name Daphnandra refers to a similarity of the anthers of the bay laurel. Greek daphne refers to the bay laurel, and andros from the Greek for man.

References

Atherospermataceae
Laurales genera
Laurales of Australia